Carn Gafallt is a Site of Special Scientific Interest in Breconshire, Powys, Wales, and a hill of 466 metres (1529 feet) which is a Marilyn.

See also
List of Sites of Special Scientific Interest in Brecknock

Sites of Special Scientific Interest in Brecknock